Hans Geister (September 28, 1928 – May 16, 2012) was a German track and field athlete, who mainly competed in the 400 metres. He was born in Duisburg-Hamborn.

He was German 400 meters champion in 1951. In the same year he was part of the CSV Marathon Krefeld club team that won the British championship 4x440 yard relay. He competed in the 4 x 400 metre relay for Germany at the 1952 Summer Olympics held in Helsinki, Finland, where he won the bronze medal with his teammates Günter Steines, Heinz Ulzheimer and Karl-Friedrich Haas.
Im 1954 he was part of the German 4x400 meters relay team which won the silver medal in the European championships. Later on he served as an honorary club coach in Krefeld working, e.g., with Arnd Krüger.

References

1928 births
2012 deaths
German male sprinters
Olympic bronze medalists for West Germany
Athletes (track and field) at the 1952 Summer Olympics
Olympic athletes of West Germany
European Athletics Championships medalists
Medalists at the 1952 Summer Olympics
Olympic bronze medalists in athletics (track and field)
Sportspeople from Duisburg